SRY-box 17 is a protein that in humans is encoded by the SOX17 gene.

Regulation at the human SOX17 locus 
The gene encodes a member of the SOX (SRY-related HMG-box) family of transcription factors, located on Chromosome 8 q11.23. It's gene body is isolated within a CTCF loop domain. Approximately 230 kb upstream of SOX17 it has been identified a tissue specific differentially (hypo-)methylated region (DMR), which consists of SOX17 regulatory elements. The DMR in particular bears the most distal definitive endoderm specific enhancer at the SOX17 locus. SOX17 itself has recently been defined as so called topologically insulated gene (TIG). TIGs per definition are single protein coding genes (PCGs) within CTCF loop domains, that are mainly enriched in developmental regulators and suggested to be very tightly controlled via their 3D loop-domain architecture.

Function in development

SOX17 is involved in the regulation of vertebrate embryonic development and in the determination of the endodermal cell fate. The encoded protein acts downstream of TGF beta signaling (Activin) and canonical WNT signaling (Wnt3a). Especially the correct phosphorylation of SMAD2/3 within the respective cell cycle (early G1 phase) is crucial for the activation of cardinal endodermal genes (e.g. SOX17) to further enter the definitive endodermal lineage. Besides that, perturbation of the SOX17 centromertic CTCF-boundary in early definitive endoderm differentiation, leads to massive developmental failure and a so called mes-endodermal like trapped cell-state, which can be rescued by ectopic SOX17 expression. In Xenopus gastrulae it has been shown that SOX17 modifies Wnt responses, where genomic specificity of Wnt/β-catenin transcription is determined through functional interactions between SOX17 and β-catenin/Tcf transcriptional complexes.

References

Further reading 

 
 
 
 
 
 
 
 
 
 MacCarthy CM, Malik V, Wu G,  et al., & Velychko S  (September 2022). "Enhancing Sox/Oct cooperativity induces higher-grade developmental reset". bioRxiv.